S v Hartmann is an important criminal case in South African law, especially in respect of its implications for euthanasia. It was heard by Van Winsen J from March 19 to 20, 1975, in the Cape Provincial Division, with judgment handed down on March 21.

Facts

The father of the accused suffered progressively and untreatably from carcinoma in his prostate, and thereafter from secondary cancer. In the terminal and emaciating stages of his illness, with no cure available, and suffering great pain, he was induced by his son, a doctor, to come with him to Ceres Hospital, where he was given heavy doses of morphine and pentothal, and died within seconds. His son was charged with murder.

Findings 
The court found that the accused had had no desire to end his father's life; his motives were compassionate, directed at the relief of his father's pain and the termination of his pitiable state. He had been aware, however, that his actions would end his father's life, and therefore had sufficient murderous intention, dolus directus, for legal purposes.

Generally speaking, the consent of the deceased is no defence to murder in South African law. Hartmann's father, of course, had been in no state to consent; had he been, however, it would have made no difference. Euthanasia is unlawful in South Africa, in that it amounts to murder. It was necessary, therefore, for the court to convict Hartmann of that crime.

The judge concluded, however, that "this is a case, if ever there was one, in which, without having to be unfair to society, full measure can be given to the element of mercy." Hartmann was sentenced to one year in prison, nearly all of it suspended. He was detained until the rising of the court, after which he was free to leave.

The Truth that was never told.
Dr Hartman's only witness, who was not called to give evidence - due his protection of his wife - is the only one who knows the full story called facts, and what really happened. The Press fed like vultures blowing the truth into eye-catching headlines to sell their twisted lies.

But from the pact made between father and son as his father's wish three weeks before, to the hospital bedside, to the Supreme Court and beyond - when vindictiveness became the ugly face of medicine in place of "Mercy to the rising of the Court" which went out the window - she saw, and heard, the man they convicted, slandered, and eventually struck off the Medical Roll, while every other medic had the right to unplug a patient's life-line, without conviction instead.

Justice and Mercy belong both in the fields of Healing, and Truth.

"A time to be born and a time to die. A time to be heal and a time to kill." - Ecclesiastes 3:1-8 - with no second thought nor terms called 'murder and punishment' for the same choice given in the fields of compassion for suffering within Animal Veterinary .

This was one Son who dearly loved his Father, informed his wife of the pact between them both, and followed through with his promise to relieve his father's absolute final hour. The only crime came from the hypocrites who took the judgement first onto themselves with false accusations. The rest is what it became.

<ref>*His Only Witness and wife - ©® Irrira Rikki

References 
 S v Hartmann 1975 (3) SA 532 (C) 1975

Notes 

1975 in South African law
1975 in case law
Euthanasia law
South African criminal case law
Western Cape Division cases